HMCS Loon was a Bird-class patrol vessel of the Royal Canadian Navy. The ship served from 1955 to 1965 before being discarded. The class was designed for harbour patrol.

Design
Bird-class patrol vessels were designed for harbour patrol, training and anti-submarine warfare. Constructed of wood and aluminum, Loon displaced .

The Bird class were powered by diesel engines creating  connected to two shafts. Loon was armed with one 20 mm gun and a Hedgehog anti-submarine mortar.

Service
Loons keel was laid down by Taylor Boat Works at their yard in Toronto and the vessel was launched on 4 October 1954. The ship was commissioned into the Royal Canadian Navy on 30 November 1955 with the pennant number PCS 780. After commissioning, Loon was used for training purposes. In 1961, Loon was assigned to Atlantic Command as a harbour patrol craft. She was used for air/sea rescue along the west coast of Canada. She was paid off on 30 August 1965.

References

Notes

Sources

External links
 Bird Class – Radio Fit – Radio Research Paper

1954 ships
Canadian Bird-class patrol vessels
Ships built in Ontario